(??-??) was a Japanese nobleman of the Meiji era. Kenkichi would have been the fifteenth Katakura Kojūrō. Served as chief priest of Aoba Shrine, in Sendai. Held the title of baron.

Family
 Father: Date Munemichi (1821-1899)
 Foster Father: Katakura Kagemitsu
 Wife: Katakura Mitsuko
 Son: Katakura Nobumitsu

External links
Katakura family tree (in Japanese)

Kazoku
Japanese Shintoists
Katakura clan